Ernst Harry Ingemar Günther (3 June 1933 – 8 December 1999) was a Swedish actor. He appeared in 66 films and television shows between 1962 and 1999. He starred in the 1974 film Gangsterfilmen, which entered into the 25th Berlin International Film Festival. At the 28th Guldbagge Awards he won the Creative Achievement award.

Partial filmography

 Out of an Old Man's Head (1968) - Man som kastar bildäck
 Som natt och dag (1969) - Sture
 Made in Sweden (1969) - Party guest
 Rötmånad (1970) - Jansson
 A Handful of Love (1974) - Finland
 Gangsterfilmen (1974) - Anders Andersson
 Ungkarlshotellet (1975) - Man
 Förvandlingen (1976) - Gregor's Father
 Vi har många namn (1976) - Police Inspector
 Games of Love and Loneliness (1977) - Jacob Randel
 Måndagarna med Fanny (1977) - Butcher
 Chez Nous (1978) - Melin
 Linus eller Tegelhusets hemlighet (1979) - Eriksson
 Gå på vattnet om du kan (1979) - Mr. Löv
 Sverige åt svenskarna (1980) - Karl Ragnar
 Brusten himmel (1982) - Molin
 Fanny and Alexander (1982) - Rector Magnificus - Teatern
 Sköna juveler (1984) - Gustav
 The Man from Majorca (1984) - Dahlgren
 Åke and His World (1984) - Reverend
 Smugglarkungen (1985) - Strauss
 Love Me! (1986) - Socialinspektören
 I lagens namn (1986) - Walltin
 The Serpent's Way (1986) - Ol Karlsa
 Valhall (1986) - Thor (voice)
 The Journey to Melonia (1989) - Caliban (voice)
 Hjälten (1990) - The Old Man
 Goda människor (1990) - The father
 House of Angels (1992) - Gottfrid Pettersson
 The Best Intentions (1992) - Freddy Paulin
 Karlakórinn Hekla (1992) - Foreldri Möggu
 Kådisbellan (1993) - Principal
 Sista dansen (1993) - Opera Director
 Good Night, Irene (1994) - Otto
 Änglagård – andra sommaren (1994) - Gottfrid Pettersson
 Hundarna i Riga (1995) - Fadern
 Den vita lejoninnan (1996) - Fadern

References

External links

1933 births
1999 deaths
People from Karlskrona
Swedish people of German descent
Swedish male film actors
Swedish film directors
Deaths from diabetes
20th-century Swedish male actors